Alex de Minaur defeated Tommy Paul in the final, 3–6, 6–4, 6–1 to win the singles tennis title at the 2023 Mexican Open. It was his seventh ATP Tour title, and first at the ATP 500 level.

Rafael Nadal was the reigning champion, but chose not to participate this year.

Seeds

Draw

Finals

Top half

Bottom half

Qualifying

Seeds

Qualifiers

Lucky losers

Qualifying draw

First qualifier

Second qualifier

Third qualifier

Fourth qualifier

References

External links 
Main draw
Qualifying draw

Abierto Mexicano Telcel - Singles